''not to be confused with Irving Fiske, born "Irving Louis Fishman"

Irving Fishman (March 29, 1921 – January 4, 2014) was an American lawyer and politician.

Born in Lynn, Massachusetts, Fishman received his bachelor's degree from Boston University and his law degree from Harvard Law School. Fishman then practiced law. He served in the Massachusetts House of Representatives 1962–1968 and the Massachusetts State Senate 1971–1974.

References

1921 births
2014 deaths
Politicians from Lynn, Massachusetts
Boston University alumni
Harvard Law School alumni
Massachusetts lawyers
Democratic Party members of the Massachusetts House of Representatives
Democratic Party Massachusetts state senators
20th-century American lawyers